Vasile Suciu (21 October 1942 – 9 November 2013) was a Romanian footballer, who primarily played as a goalkeeper.

Suciu died of lung cancer in 2013 at the age of 71, in Cluj-Napoca.

Honours

Club 
Arieșul Turda
Romanian Cup (1): 1960–61

Steaua București
Romanian League (1): 1967–68
Romanian Cup (5): 1965–66, 1966–67, 1968–69, 1969–70, 1970–71

International
Romania
UEFA European Under-18 Championship: 1962

Notes

References

External links

1942 births
2013 deaths
People from Cluj County
Romanian footballers
Olympic footballers of Romania
Romania international footballers
Association football goalkeepers
Liga I players
ACS Sticla Arieșul Turda players
FC Steaua București players
CSM Jiul Petroșani players
FC Sportul Studențesc București players
Deaths from cancer in Romania
Deaths from lung cancer